Booth Park is a cricket ground in Chelford Road, Toft, Cheshire. The ground lies within the grounds of Booths Park, which surrounds the east and south of the ground, while the western side is bordered by residential housing. The ground is used by Toft Cricket Club.

History
The ground was established in 1928. Cheshire first used the ground in the 1982 Minor Counties Championship against Northumberland. The ground hosted a single Minor Counties Championship annually until 1998, with fourteen matches being played there, the last of which saw Oxfordshire at the visitors. The ground held its first List A match when Cheshire played Cornwall in the second round of the 2002 Cheltenham & Gloucester Trophy, which was held in 2001 to avoid fixture congestion. A second List A match was held there in 2002, when Cheshire played Huntingdonshire in the first round of the 2003 Cheltenham & Gloucester Trophy, with its early round matches once again played in the season before to avoid fixture congestion in 2003. Cheshire lost to Cornwall, but defeated Huntingdonshire. Cheshire returned to the ground in 2012, playing a MCCA Knockout Trophy match against Dorset.

Records

List A
 Highest team total: 230/5 (50 overs) by Cheshire v Huntingdonshire, 2001
 Lowest team total: 151 all out (43.3 overs) by Cheshire v Cornwall, 2002
 Highest individual innings: 74 by Benjamin Price for Cornwall v Cheshire, as above
 Best bowling in an innings: 4/21 by Abey Kuruvilla for Cheshire v Cornwall, as above

Gallery

See also
List of cricket grounds in England and Wales

References

External links

Booth Park at CricketArchive
Booth Park at ESPNcricinfo

Cricket grounds in Cheshire
Cheshire County Cricket Club
Sports venues completed in 1928
1928 establishments in England